William J. McLane (March 5, 1947 – February 22, 2010) was a Democratic member of the Pennsylvania House of Representatives.

References

Democratic Party members of the Pennsylvania House of Representatives
2010 deaths
1947 births